Skin is an EP by Collide, released on June 3, 1996 by Nightshade Productions and SPV GmbH. The EP comprises seven remixes from Beneath the Skin, including six versions of the titletrack and one remix of "Deep". The Razors Edge and Constrictor mixes of "Beneath the Skin" appeared on the Vis-À-Vis Vol-II compilations and the band's remix album Distort.

Track listing

Personnel
Adapted from the Skin liner notes.

Collide
 Eric Anest (as Statik) – programming, noises, production, mixing (1, 8), additional remixer (5)
 Karin Johnston (as Tripp9) – vocals

Additional performers
 Bob Andrews – additional bass guitar (2)
 Phillip Boa – remixer (2)
 Danny Borsheid – additional guitar (1)
 Chris Candelaria – guitar (7)
 Thomas Franzmann (as Zip Campisi) –remixer (5)
 cEvin Key – remixer (6)
 Bruno Kramm – remixer (3)
 Ken Marshall – remixer (6)
 Wrex Mock – remixer (4)
 Patrice Synthea – backing vocals (4)
 Anthony Valcic – remixer (6)
 David Vella – keyboards and engineering (2)

Production and design
 Jack Atlantis – additional engineering (7)
 Susan Jennings – cover art, illustrations, design, photography
 Howard Keith – engineering (2)
 Jack Pedota – photography
 Steve West – photography

Release history

References

External links 
 Skin at collide.net
 

Collide (band) albums
1996 EPs
Remix EPs
SPV GmbH EPs